Shooting at the 2017 Islamic Solidarity Games was held in Baku Shooting Centre, Baku, Azerbaijan from 13 to 17 May 2017.

Medalists

Men

Women

Mixed

Medal table

References

External links
Official website

Islamic Solidarity Games
2017 Islamic Solidarity Games
2017
Islamic Solidarity Games